Linda Marie Pira Giraldo, (born 25 August 1985) is a Swedish rapper. She grew up in Hässelby in western Stockholm where she still resides.

Her parents, Kjell, a bar owner and Zulima lived in Colombia. After Linda was born, they all moved to Sweden. Linda Pira went to high school at Fryshuset, where she studied music with artists such as Lykke Li, Näääk and Sebastian Stakset.

Pira was featured on rapper Stor's single "Rom och Kush" in the fall of 2012. During the summer of 2013, she released the double single "Bang Bang" / "Bäng Bäng". The Salazar Brothers produced her first EP Matriarken in late 2013. The EP was released under Redline Records label.

During 2013, SVT play broadcast the documentary Linda Pira - Som du inte visste. The six-episode documentary series was produced by Anneli Kustfält and Agnes-Lo Åkerlind. Åkerlind described Pira with the words "She is thoughtful and rational, political and at the same time she is not, a person who seeks adrenaline kicks and chill. She is a role model but is still doing her own thing. Also she works in an industry where the female sex is underrepresented and that is interesting to me.".

In 2014, Linda Pira received an award at Grammisgalan in the category "Best Newcomer 2013". and on 2 March 2014 the remix of "Knäpper mina fingrar" entered Digilistan being an all-female collective effort by Linda Pira, Rawda, Vanessa Falk, Julia Spada, Joy, Sep, Rosh, Kumba and Cleo. On 19 June 2014, she released the songs "Överlever allt", and "Sho katt" featuring Dani M. She participated in Stjärnornas stjärna broadcast on TV4.

Awards
2014: Newcomer of the year during Grammis Awards 2014 
2014: Live performance of the year during Award Awards

Discography

Albums

EPs
2013: Matriarken

Singles

Featured on

Notes

References

Living people
1985 births
Swedish-language singers
Swedish women rappers
Swedish people of Colombian descent
Swedish people of Walloon descent